Saints Unified Voices is a Grammy Award-winning American gospel music choir based in the Las Vegas Valley of Southern Nevada. The Saints Unified Voices Foundation, the governing organization of the choir, is directed by a board of directors, which includes Gladys Knight. The choir is affiliated with The Church of Jesus Christ of Latter-day Saints.

Early years
In the Spring of 2001, Gladys Knight put together a small singing group to perform with her at Women's Conference at Brigham Young University in Provo, Utah. Later, Sullivan Richardson asked her to form a choir to perform at a special fireside event back home in Henderson, Nevada. Vocalists came from as far away as Los Angeles to audition for the choir and members of the choir even travel from Utah for practices.

In 2003, the choir was invited to perform at Salt Lake Tabernacle on Temple Square in Salt Lake City, Utah as part of the anniversary celebration of the priesthood being available to all worthy men.

Recordings

One Voice
The choir released a CD, One Voice, on January 4, 2005. In the first week, the album soared to Billboard's #1 on the Hot Shot Debut, while it simultaneously shot to the #1 Gospel Album and #2 Inspirational Album on iTunes. It remained in the top 40 on Billboard′s Gospel charts for 48 weeks.

Track Listings
One Voice (Interlude) - Gladys Knight, written by Matthew Pittman
Over My Head - Gladys Knight
Come, Come, Ye Saints - Gladys Knight, written by William Clayton
Love One Another - Gladys Knight, written by Luacine Clark Fox
Pass Me Not - Gladys Knight
Right Here Waiting - (Damon Andelin and J. Johnigan) written by BeBe Winans
Prayer - Gladys Knight, written by Mauli B
Did You Know - Gladys Knight and John Fluker, written by BeBe Winans
I Am a Child of God - Gladys Knight, lyrics written by Naomi W. Randall
Jesu Me Kanaka Waiwai - (Joe Apo soloist)
Blessed Assurance - Gladys Knight
He Shines on Me - (Kelly Eisenhour soloist), written by John Fluker and Kelly Eisenhour
Uphold Me - (Whitney Te'o soloist) written by Fred Manns
He's Worthy - (John Fluker soloist)
He Lives - Gladys Knight

A Christmas Celebration
The 100-voice choir released its second album A Christmas Celebration in October 2006.
Track Listings
Introduction/Opening - Gladys Knight
Breath of Heaven - (Kenya Jackson soloist), written by Chris Eaton
Silent Night/O Holy Night - Gladys Knight, written by Joseph Mohr
I Wonder as I Wander - (Heather Goedel soloist), written by John Jacob Niles
We Three Kings - (Jay Young soloist), written by John H. Hopkins Jr.
Little Drummer Boy - Gladys Knight, written by Katherine Davis
Oh, Come, All Ye Faithful - (Rashida Jordan soloist), written by John Francis Wade
Jesus, Oh, What a Wonderful Child-(Quartet) Gladys Knight, Damon Andelin, Whitney Te'o, Rashida Jordan, & the incomparable SUV BASE section
The Christmas Song (Chestnuts Roasting on an Open Fire) - (Whitney Te'o soloist), written by Mel Torme
White Christmas - Gladys Knight, written by Irving Berlin
Winter Wonderland/Jingle Bells - Gladys Knight, written by Richard B. Smith
The Lord's Prayer - (Damon Andelin soloist)

Live performances
The choir presents its program "One Voice: An Evening of Music & Testimony" at stake centers and other buildings owned by the Church of Jesus Christ of Latter-day Saints across the US, and has traveled as far as England and Hawaii to share the gospel through music and song.

Awards and certifications
Shortly after learning that her choir had been nominated for a Grammy Award, Gladys Knight said: "A Grammy nomination is always an honor, but this means even more to me because I share it with my choir. We worked hard making this album for the Lord. It's wonderful that it also pleases the music industry." On February 8, 2006, it was announced that the album One Voice won the 2005 Grammy Award for Best Gospel Choir Or Chorus Album as part of the 48th Annual Grammy Awards.

See also
 
 Culture of The Church of Jesus Christ of Latter-day Saints

References

External links
 
  (video by Newfly Films)

American gospel musical groups
Latter Day Saint musical groups
Musical groups established in 2002
2002 establishments in Nevada